Patrick Miller (21 September 1907 – 2 December 1993) was an English cricketer. He played first-class cricket for Bengal, Europeans and Madras.

See also
 List of Bengal cricketers

References

External links
 

1907 births
1993 deaths
English cricketers
Bengal cricketers
Europeans cricketers
Tamil Nadu cricketers